The discography of Japanese singer-songwriter Kenshi Yonezu consists of five studio albums, two Vocaloid albums, and thirteen singles.

Albums

Studio albums

Singles

As lead artist

As featured artist

Promotional singles

Other charted songs

Notes

References

Discographies of Japanese artists